Harry Oswald Bell (25 January 1897 – 9 August 1980) was an Australian rules footballer who played with Carlton in the Victorian Football League (VFL).

Notes

External links 

Harry Bell's profile at Blueseum

1897 births
1980 deaths
Australian rules footballers from Melbourne
Carlton Football Club players
People from Carlton North, Victoria